National Revival Day (Azerbaijani: Milli Dirçəliş Günü) - is a national holiday celebrated in Azerbaijan every year on the 17th of November. Since 1992, 17 November has been celebrated as a National Revival Day in the country.

History 
On 17 November 1988 mass demonstrations were started against the Soviet Union in Baku's then Lenin Square. Demonstrators were mostly concerned about the outbreak of the Nagorno-Karabakh conflict and the influx of Azeri refugees. While the demands were for the reform of the political system to adapt to the changing situation and a strong action against Armenians in that region, many called for Azeri secession from the Soviet Union as an independent republic and the release from prison of the Azeris who were involved in the Sumgait pogrom, who were convicted for the murder of Armenians.  On 22 November a curfew was imposed in Baku, and contingents of Soviet Army infantry and tank divisions, together with Internal Troops and the Militia, began to be deployed to the city, with the local units activated to prevent protest actions. In December 3 protesters were dispersed by force and approximately 400 people were arrested. 

The Day of National Revival symbolizes the beginning of the national liberation movement for the Azerbaijani people in general which led to the formation of the Popular Front of Azerbaijan in late 1988. As a result, Azerbaijan became an independent state in 1991 just 3 years after the historic demonstrations.

Today the 1988 events are marked as the beginning of a renewed national awakening of the Azeri nation.

References 

National holidays
Public holidays in Azerbaijan
November observances
Autumn events in Azerbaijan